Victor Carl Lindquist (March 22, 1908 – November 30, 1983) was a Canadian ice hockey player who competed in the 1932 Winter Olympics. Lindquist was born in Gold Rock, Ontario.

Lindquist led the Winnipeg Hockey Club, the Canadian team which won the gold medal at the 1932 Winter Olympics. He played five matches and scored three goals.

He was inducted into the International Ice Hockey Federation Hall of Fame in 1997. He is also a member of the North Western Ontario Sports Hall of Fame. He coached the Swedish national team at the 1936 Olympics.

Lindquist was nominated by Canadian Amateur Hockey Association president Jack Roxburgh to represent Canada as a referee at the 1962 Ice Hockey World Championships.

Awards and achievements
Allan Cup Championship (1931)
Olympic Gold Medalist (1932)
World Championship Gold Medalist (1935)
Inducted into the IIHF Hall of Fame in 1997
Inducted into the Manitoba Sports Hall of Fame and Museum in 2004
Honoured Member of the Manitoba Hockey Hall of Fame

References

External links
 
Victor Lindquist's biography at databaseOlympics.com
Vic Lindquist’s biography at Manitoba Sports Hall of Fame and Museum
Vic Lindquist's biography at Manitoba Hockey Hall of Fame

1908 births
1983 deaths
Canadian ice hockey coaches
Canadian people of Swedish descent
Ice hockey people from Ontario
Ice hockey players at the 1932 Winter Olympics
IIHF Hall of Fame inductees
Medalists at the 1932 Winter Olympics
Olympic gold medalists for Canada
Olympic medalists in ice hockey
Olympic ice hockey players of Canada
Sweden men's national ice hockey team coaches
Winnipeg Hockey Club players
Winnipeg Monarchs players